The 2016–17 CSKA season was the 25th successive season that the club played in the Russian Premier League, the highest tier of association football in Russia. CSKA were defending Russian Premier League champions, and as a result will enter the Champions League at the Groups stage, and also take part in the Russian Cup. They finished the season in second place, behind Spartak Moscow, were knocked out of the Russian Cup by Yenisey Krasnoyarsk and finished fourth in their Champions League group that contained AS Monaco, Bayer Leverkusen and Tottenham Hotspur.

Season Events
On 6 October 2016, Finland announced that Roman Eremenko had been handed a 30-day ban from football by UEFA, with UEFA announcing on 18 November 2016, that Eremenko had been handed a 2-year ban from football due to testing positive for cocaine.

On 2 December 2016, Golovin extended his contract with CSKA Moscow until the end of the 2020–21 season.

On 6 December 2016, CSKA announced that manager Leonid Slutsky would leave the club after seven-years at the club, following their last game of 2016, away to Tottenham Hotspurs. 6 days later, 12 December, Viktor Goncharenko was announced as the club's new manager, signing a two-year contract.

Squad

Out on loan

Transfers

In

Out

Loans in

Loans out

Released

Friendlies

Competitions

Russian Super Cup

Russian Premier League

Results by round

Matches

League table

Russian Cup

UEFA Champions League

Group stage

Squad statistics

Appearances and goals

|-
|colspan="14"|Banned by UEFA:

|-
|colspan="14"|Players away from the club on loan:
|-
|colspan="14"|Players who left CSKA Moscow during the season:

|}

Goal Scorers

Disciplinary record

Notes

References

PFC CSKA Moscow seasons
CSKA Moscow
CSKA Moscow